The 2008 Morgan State Bears football team represented of the Morgan State University during the 2008 NCAA Division I FCS football season as a member of the Mid-Eastern Athletic Conference (MEAC).  This was the seventh season under the guidance of head coach Donald Hill-Eley. The team finished the season at 6–6 overall and 4–4 in the MEAC, losing its final three games of the season.

Schedule

Game summaries

Towson
The Towson Tigers rallied to beat Morgan State 21-16. Devan James ran for a career-high 178 yards on 33 carries.

Towson improved to 16-5 all-time against Morgan State as quarterback Sean Schaefer threw three touchdowns and became Towson's all-time passing yardage record holder surpassing the 8,900 career passing yards set by Dan Crowley (1991–94).

North Carolina Central

Winston-Salem State

Rutgers

Morgan State only managed 109 yards and saw its two-game winning streak snapped in a 38-0 loss to Rutgers.

Bethune–Cookman
Morgan State had 312 yards of total offense, but  scored twice off turnovers and beat the Bears 31-27. Devan James ran for 113 yards on 22 carries and a touchdown in the second quarter.

The Bears got as close as four points after QB Carlton Jackson threw a 27-yard touchdown to Edwin Baptiste, but James Meade's extra point attempt was blocked by the Wildcats. Jackson recovered a fumble in the end zone in the second quarter for a touchdown.

Bethune-Cookman had 213 total offensive yards, but only two first downs in the second half.

The Bears fall to 2-3 overall and 1-1 in the MEAC. The Wildcats improved to 4-1 overall and 2-1 in the MEAC.

North Carolina A&T

Devan James rushed for 103 yards and Mario Melton rushed for 97 yards as the Bears improved to 3-3 overall and 1-1 in the Mid-Eastern Athletic Conference. The Aggies fell to 2-5 overall and 0-3 in the conference.

Howard
Keith Lee scored on a 3-yard run in the second overtime as Morgan State beat , 31-30. Devan James rushed for two touchdowns and 219 yards (36 carries) Lee finished with 29 yards (8 carries) as the Bears improved to 4-3 overall and 2-1 in the Mid-Eastern Athletic Conference.

Delaware State
Devan James scored two touchdowns and ran for a total of 103 yards in a 20-3 victory over Delaware State University. The Bears forced the Hornets into four turnovers.

Florida A&M
Morgan State capped an 11-play, 41-yard drive with a 39-yard field goal with 16 seconds left for a 13-10 win over Florida A&M. It was the Bears fourth consecutive victory.

Morgan State improved to 6-3 overall and 4-1 in the Mid-Eastern Athletic Conference)

Norfolk State

South Carolina State

Hampton

References

Morgan State
Morgan State Bears football seasons
Morgan State Bears football